Fort James was established in 1865 as a cavalry fort in South Dakota.

Established
Fort James was built in 1865 in Hanson County, South Dakota. The fort was located on the James River at its junction with Shell Creek.

History
The fort was abandoned in 1867.  There are reports that the fort was partly burned about two years after it was abandoned.

Description
Fort James is the only stone-built fort in the period of US expansion to the west.

Television Coverage
Fort James was the subject of an episode of the PBS TV archaeology series Time Team America.

Notes

References
 Lee, Robert, Fort Meade, the peace keeper post on the Dakota Frontier, 1878-1944,Old Fort Meade Museum & Historic Research Association, 1987.
 Osburn, James D.,  Stewart,Ken R. and  Wendt, Lonis R. Fort Pierre-Deadwood Trail: Then & Now, Cheyenne River Press, 2008.

External links

 Anniversary Wagon Train is a 17-day ride into History

Buildings and structures in Hanson County, South Dakota
James
Pre-statehood history of South Dakota
National Register of Historic Places in Hanson County, South Dakota